Ric or RIC may refer to:

Codes and regulations
 Radio Identity Code, an address used in the POCSAG protocol for pagers
 Resin identification code, codes/symbols for recycling of plastics
 Reuters Instrument Code, a ticker-like code used by Thomson Reuters to identify financial instruments
 Richmond International Airport (IATA: RIC)
 Rickmansworth station, England, National Rail station code RIC
 Regolamento Internazionale delle Carrozze (International Coach Regulations), requirements for passenger coaches in Europe

Companies and organizations
 Rehabilitation Institute of Chicago, a rehabilitation hospital in Chicago
 Rickenbacker International Corporation, a guitar manufacturer
 Rhode Island College, Providence, Rhode Island
 RIC TV (Rede Independência de Comunicação), a Brazilian television network
 Royal Institute of Chemistry
 Royal Institution of Cornwall
 Royal Irish Constabulary, the police force in Ireland from 1822 until 1922, when the country was part of the United Kingdom

Other uses
 RIC Forum (Russia, India, China). A group of countries that is grouped together in politics, who also have official summits.
 Roman Imperial Coinage, a 1949 chronological catalogue of coins from the time of the Roman Empire
 Ric, abbreviation of Recreative International Center; see Ric's Art Boat
 Ric, pen name of Canadian cartoonist Richard Taylor (1902–1970)
 Ric., an abbreviation of the name Richard
 RIC, symbol for the Ricci curvature tensor in mathematics
 Reading In Copy, in email context, a reference made to those recipients that were in the CC list of the email
 Regulated investment company
 Routine infant circumcision
 Radical Independence Campaign, a Scottish left-wing political campaign
 Rapid intervention crew, a firefighting procedure
 Recognised independent centre, a status awarded to institutes and centres by Oxford University
 Revised Index Catalogue, of astronomical objects
 Royal Irish Constabulary, Irish police force (1822–1922)
 Reduced intensity conditioning, in oncology
 Rehabilitation Impairment Categories (RICs), used to assign Case mix groups (CMGs)
 Webley RIC, a revolver adopted by the Royal Irish Constabulary in 1868